The 2019 University Credit Union West Coast Conference women's basketball tournament was a postseason women's basketball tournament held for the West Coast Conference for the 2018–19 season. All tournament games were played at the Orleans Arena in the Las Vegas area community of Paradise, Nevada from March 7–12, 2019. BYU won the championship game over Gonzaga. Paisley Johnson was named the tournament's Most Outstanding Player.

Seeds
All 10 WCC schools will participate in the tournament. Teams will be seeded by conference record, with the following tiebreaker system used to seed teams with identical conference records:
 Head-to-head record.
 Record against the top team in the conference not involved in the tie, going down through the standings as necessary to break the tie. Should more than one team be tied for a position in the standings, collective records against all teams involved in that tie are considered.
 RPI at the end of the conference season.
The tournament will return to a format similar to that used from 2003 to 2011, with slight changes to the terminology used for the rounds prior to the semifinals. The 7 through 10 seeds will play in what is now called the "opening round", the 5 and 6 seeds will start play in the "second round", and the 3 and 4 seeds will start in the "third round". The top two seeds will receive byes into the semifinals.

* Overall record at end of regular season.

Schedule

Bracket and scores
 All games except the championship will air on BYUtv games and be simulcast on TheW.tv. The championship will air on ESPNU.

See also

 2018–19 NCAA Division I women's basketball season
 West Coast Conference men's basketball tournament
 2019 West Coast Conference men's basketball tournament
 West Coast Conference women's basketball tournament

References

External links

Tournament
West Coast Conference women's basketball tournament
West Coast Conference women's basketball tournament
West Coast Conference women's basketball tournament
Basketball competitions in the Las Vegas Valley
College basketball tournaments in Nevada
Women's sports in Nevada
College sports tournaments in Nevada